Ghola is a locality in Panihati Municipality of North 24 Parganas district in the Indian state of West Bengal. It is close to Kolkata and also a part of the area covered by Kolkata Metropolitan Development Authority (KMDA).

Geography

Location

96% of the population of Barrackpore subdivision (partly presented in the map alongside, all places marked on the map are linked in the full screen map) lives in urban areas. In 2011, it had a density of population of 10,967 per km2. The subdivision has 16 municipalities and 24 census towns.

For most of the cities/ towns information regarding density of population is available in the Infobox. Population data is not available for neighbourhoods. It is available for the entire Municipal area and thereafter ward-wise.

Police station
Ghola police station under Barrackpore Police Commissionerate has jurisdiction over Panihati and New Barrackpore Municipal areas.

Post Office
Ghola has a delivery branch post office, with PIN 700111 in the North Presidency Division of North 24 Parganas district in Calcutta region. The only other post office with the same PIN is Ghola Bazar.

Kolkata Urban Agglomeration
The following Municipalities, Census Towns and other locations in Barrackpore subdivision were part of Kolkata Urban Agglomeration in the 2011 census: Kanchrapara (M), Jetia (CT), Halisahar (M), Balibhara (CT), Naihati (M), Bhatpara (M), Kaugachhi (CT), Garshyamnagar (CT), Garulia (M), Ichhapur Defence Estate (CT), North Barrackpur (M), Barrackpur Cantonment (CB), Barrackpore (M), Jafarpur (CT), Ruiya (CT), Titagarh (M), Khardaha (M), Bandipur (CT), Panihati (M), Muragachha (CT) New Barrackpore (M), Chandpur (CT), Talbandha (CT), Patulia (CT), Kamarhati (M), Baranagar (M), South Dumdum (M), North Dumdum (M), Dum Dum (M), Noapara (CT), Babanpur (CT), Teghari (CT), Nanna (OG), Chakla (OG), Srotribati (OG) and Panpur (OG).

Ghola is a part of Panihati Municipality.

Transport
Ghola is located on the Sodepur-Barasat road.

Bus

Private Bus
 56 Ruiya Purbapara - Howrah Station
 214 Sajirhat - Babughat
 DN43 Barasat Checkpost - Dakshineswar

Bus Route Without Number
 Madhyamgram - Howrah Station

Train
The nearest railway stations are Madhyamgram railway station on the Sealdah-Bangaon line and Sodepur railway station on the Sealdah-Ranaghat line.

Education
Thirthabharari Shiksha mandir ward no 31.Ghola High School in Ward No. 28 of Panihati Municipality is a Bengali-medium boys only higher secondary school. It was established in 1957. adarsha prathamik vidyalaya ward no-29 .

Ghola Girls High School in Ward No. 28 of Panihati Municipality is a Bengali-medium girls only higher secondary school. It was established in 1959.

References

Cities and towns in North 24 Parganas district
Neighbourhoods in North 24 Parganas district
Neighbourhoods in Kolkata
Kolkata Metropolitan Area